NPPL is the UK National Private Pilot Licence.

NPPL may also refer to:
 National Professional Paintball League, a former Speedball (paintball) league
 NPPL Championship Paintball 2009, a video game